Geneviève Waïte (born Genevieve Joyce Weight, 13 February 1948 – 18 May 2019) was a South African actress, singer, and model. Her best known acting role was the title character in the 1968 film Joanna. She was a muse to photographer Richard Avedon, who shot her several times for Vogue in the early 1970s. In 1974, she recorded her only album as a singer produced and written by her husband John Phillips of the Mamas and the Papas. Her singing voice has been described as “Betty Boop crossed with Billie Holiday”. That same year, she starred in a short-lived Broadway musical, Man on the Moon, which she co-wrote with John Phillips and was produced by Andy Warhol.

Personal life
Waite married Matthew Reich, who appeared in Andy Warhol’s film ‘Bad’ and was known latterly by the nickname ‘Crazy Matty’ in the ‘Andy Warhol Diaries’, on 10 December 1968; They later divorced. Waite then married John Phillips, on 31 January 1972, at a Chinese restaurant in Los Angeles' Chinatown by a one-legged Buddhist priest. They had two children: Tamerlane Phillips (b. 1971) and actress Bijou Phillips (b. 1980). They divorced in 1985. She then married Norman Buntaine; they later separated.

Filmography
 Joanna (1968) as "Joanna".
 Move (1970) as "The Girl"
 Myra Breckinridge (1970) as the "Dental patient" (uncredited)
 Short Distance (1989) as Mona

Music
Waite's 1974 album Romance Is on the Rise, released on John Phillips label Paramour, featured a cover image of Waite as a Vargas girl shot by Richard Avedon. A 2011 release of the album on CD includes her cover version of the Velvet Underground song "Femme Fatale" as a bonus track.

Death
On 18 May 2019, Waite died in her sleep in Los Angeles, California. Her daughter, Bijou, announced her mother's death several days later.

References

External links
 
 

English emigrants to South Africa
1948 births
2019 deaths
Actresses from Cape Town
Burials at Forest Lawn Cemetery (Cathedral City)
South African film actresses
South African emigrants to the United States
South African female models
20th-century South African women singers
White South African people